Postville is a village in Allamakee and Clayton counties in the U.S. state of Iowa. It lies near the junction of four counties and at the intersection of U.S. Routes 18 and 52 and Iowa Highway 51, with airport facilities in the neighboring communities of Waukon, Decorah, Monona and Prairie du Chien. The population was 2,503 at the time of the 2020 census, up from 2,273 in 2000. The village is in Allamakee County's southwestern corner and the Clayton County's northwestern corner in a quad county, or four-corner region, where four counties intersect. Winneshiek County is just to the west and Fayette County just to the southwest of Postville.

History
Postville was platted in 1853. The city was named for Joel Post, a pioneer settler.

In 1987, a group of Hasidic Jews started Agriprocessors, a Kosher slaughterhouse, in Postville. After numerous accusations of mistreatment of cattle, pollution, and violations of labor law, the federal government raided the facility in May 2008, resulting in hundreds of arrests of undocumented workers. Agriprocessors filed for bankruptcy on November 5, 2008; SHF Industries bought the plant at auction in July 2009 and it has resumed production under the new name Agri Star.

Geography
Postville's longitude and latitude coordinates in decimal form are 43.085102, -91.569515.

Climate

Demographics

2020 census
As of the census of 2020, the population was 2,503. The racial makeup of the city was 52.7% White, 8.7% Black or African American, 2.8% Native American, 0.6% Asian, 26.8% from other races, and 8.3% from two or more races. Ethnically, the population was 43.0% Hispanic or Latino of any race.

2010 census
As of the census of 2010, there were 2,227 people, 744 households, and 497 families residing in the city. The racial makeup of the city was 77.0% White, 4.4% African American, 0.6% Native American, 1.0% Asian, 0.7% Pacific Islander, 14.3% from other races, and 2.0% from two or more races. Hispanic or Latino of any race were 32.0% of the population.

There were 744 households, of which 40.3% had children under the age of 18 living with them, 47.7% were married couples living together, 14.2% had a female householder with no husband present, 4.8% had a male householder with no wife present, and 33.2% were non-families. 26.9% of all households were made up of individuals, and 12.3% had someone living alone who was 65 years of age or older. The average household size was 2.92 and the average family size was 3.54.

The median age in the city was 30.2 years. 32.7% of residents were under the age of 18; 9.8% were between the ages of 18 and 24; 24.6% were from 25 to 44; 18.4% were from 45 to 64; and 14.5% were 65 years of age or older. The gender makeup of the city was 50.4% male and 49.6% female.

2000 census
As of the census of 2000, there were 2,273 people, 792 households, and 548 families residing in the city. The racial makeup of the city was 79.59% White, 0.62% Native American, 0.70% Asian, 17.03% from other races, and 2.07% from two or more races. Hispanic or Latino of any race were 20.63% of the population. Estimates of the Hasidic population range from 150 (American Jewish Year Book) to more than 300. 30% of Postville's residents were German, 18% Mexican, 10% Norwegian, 6% English, 6% Ukrainian, 5% Russian, 4% Irish, and 2% Swiss.

There were 792 households, out of which 32.1% had children under the age of 18 living with them, 56.6% were married couples living together, 8.7% had a female householder with no husband present, and 30.7% were non-families. 25.5% of all households were made up of individuals, and 15.9% had someone living alone who was 65 years of age or older. The average household size was 2.78 and the average family size was 3.17.

Age spread: 25.7% under the age of 18, 9.8% from 18 to 24, 28.1% from 25 to 44, 19.5% from 45 to 64, and 16.9% who were 65 years of age or older. The median age was 35 years. For every 100 females, there were 100.6 males. For every 100 females age 18 and over, there were 97.8 males.

The median income for a household in the city was $32,667, and the median income for a family was $40,125. Males had a median income of $22,083 versus $16,596 for females. The per capita income for the city was $14,264. About 9.4% of families and 12.7% of the population were below the poverty line, including 12.7% of those under age 18 and 10.5% of those age 65 or over.

Ethnic groups
In 2017 about one quarter of Postville's population were recent immigrants from Latin America and Somalia; Greg Flakus of Voice of America stated that this was ethnically diverse compared to most Iowa towns, which are almost uniformly non-Hispanic white, even though "Postville is not all that diverse" compared to major American metropolitan areas. The earliest immigrants were from England, Germany, and Scandinavia.

Orthodox Jews established Agriprocessors circa 1987; its founders came from New York City. At its peak, there were about 100 Orthodox Jewish families in Postville. After the 2008 raid, the number declined, and in 2017 there were about 50. Postville has services for Jewish families typically seen in larger communities. It also has a Jewish elementary school and a yeshiva. A Judaic library opened in 2005, but closed after the raid.

The 2008 raid led to the arrests of Hispanics; the resulting lack of labor drew Somalis to Postville from Minnesota and Wisconsin to work in the area kosher factory. Mother Jones said this caused a "cultural shift".

Postville: A Clash of Cultures in Heartland America discusses the arrival of the Orthodox Jews.

Economy
Postville's growth was due to the presence of two large meat processing plants, Agriprocessors and Iowa Turkey Products. The Iowa Turkey Products plant burned in December 2003; it was rebuilt in Marshall, Minnesota.

Agriprocessors, a kosher meat plant, was the largest of its type in the world. As of February 2008 it employed about 900 people and purchased $100 million worth of livestock annually. In May 2008, it was the target of a federal Immigration and Customs Enforcement raid. Subsequently, a criminal complaint was filed against Agriprocessors and its principal for alleged violations of child labor laws. As a result of its legal problems, Agriprocessors became insolvent and was run by a Chapter 11 bankruptcy trustee until SHF Industries bought it at auction in July 2009. It resumed business as Agri Star Meat & Poultry, LLC under the new ownership.

, 700 people, more than 30% of the total population, work at Agri Star; about 100 are of Somali origin.

Postville is also the home of a composites factory, Norplex-Micarta, started in 1975. The Norplex factory produces laminated plastics plate, sheet, and profile shapes. As of 2007 it employed between 150 and 200 workers.

Education
Postville Community School District operates public schools. John R. Mott High School is the local high school.

Mesivta of Postville is the area yeshiva.

Notable people
 William McKinley (1879–1964), 44th speaker of the Illinois House of Representatives, raised in Postville
 John R. Mott (1865–1955), recipient of the 1946 Nobel Peace Prize, childhood resident of Postville
 Brett Szabo (born 1968), NBA player, childhood resident of Postville

References

Books on Postville 
 The interaction of long-time Postville residents with newcomers was the subject of a book about the town, Postville: A Clash of Cultures in Heartland America', by Stephen G. Bloom, a professor at University of Iowa.
 A more recent book about the community and its experience with diversity before and after the May 2008 federal immigration raid is Postville USA: Surviving Diversity in Small-Town America'' by Mark Grey, Michele Devlin, and Aaron Goldsmith.

External links

 
Official City Website
City-Data Comprehensive Statistical Data and more about Postville

Cities in Allamakee County, Iowa
Cities in Clayton County, Iowa
Cities in Iowa
Jews and Judaism in Iowa
Orthodox Jewish communities
Orthodox Judaism in the United States
Ukrainian communities in the United States
1853 establishments in Iowa
Populated places established in 1853